The Postal and Telecommunications Department was an Australian Government department, established in 1975 to take over the residual functions of the Postmaster-General's Department after its postal and telecommunications functions were split into the Australian Postal Commission (trading as Australia Post) and the Australian Telecommunications Commission (trading as Telecom, and which later became Telstra) respectively. The Department was abolished in November 1980.

History
The Department was created in December 1975 by the Fraser Government, replacing the Postmaster-General's Department which had been in operation since Australia's federation in 1901. The change was intended to take account of the increase in the functions of the department to include all electronic media matters which had previously been the responsibility of the Department of the Media.

Scope
Information about the department's functions and/or government funding allocation could be found in the Administrative Arrangements Orders, the annual Portfolio Budget Statements and in the Department's annual reports.

At its creation, the Department was responsible for postal, telegraphic, telephonic and other like services.

Structure
The Department was an Australian Public Service department, staffed by officials who were responsible to the Minister of the day.

References

Ministries established in 1975
Defunct government departments of Australia